Yaguarcocha, Yahuarcocha or Yawarcocha (possibly from Quechua yawar blood qucha lake, "blood lake") is a lake in Peru located in the Cajamarca Region, Cajabamba Province, Sitacocha District.

References 

Lakes of Cajamarca Region
Lakes of Peru